Cornifin-B is a protein that in humans is encoded by the SPRR1B gene.

References

Further reading